Anita Sowińska (born 26 July 1973) is a Polish economist, politician and member of Spring, a social-liberal and pro-European party. She has been a member of the Sejm since 12 November 2019 after winning 13,023 votes in Piotrków Trybunalski district at the 2019 Polish parliamentary elections. Sowińska also ran unsuccessfully for the European Parliament in Łódź constituency at the 2019 elections.

See also

9th term Sejm and 10th term Senate of Poland
List of Sejm members (2019–23)

References

Living people
1973 births
Spring (political party) politicians
Members of the Polish Sejm 2019–2023
21st-century Polish women politicians
Łódź University of Technology alumni
People from Tomaszów Mazowiecki